Federal elections were held in Switzerland on 20 October 1991. The Free Democratic Party remained the largest party in the National Council, winning 44 of the 200 seats.

Results

National Council

By constituency

Council of the States

References 

1991 elections in Switzerland
Federal elections in Switzerland
October 1991 events in Europe